Xpax, launched in 2004, is Celcom Axiata Berhad’s line of prepaid mobile plan.  As of December 2017, it served over 6.72 million subscribers, it comprises the majority of Celcom’s 9.56 million total subscriber base

Services
Xpax offers prepaid and mobile internet plans through the Celcom network. It is the first prepaid service to offer 4G LTE connectivity in Malaysia.

Brand
Xpax features two sub-brands. S.O.X. (School of X) is aimed at school children and teens aged 13–17 years. U.O.X. (University of X) is aimed at university and college students aged 17–23 years.  
 
Since 2013, the brand has employed the tagline “Got 4G LTE Time!”.

References

External links
 Celcom
 Xpax

2004 establishments in Malaysia
Celcom